Dravidar Viduthalai Kazhagam (DVK) is a social movement in the state of Tamil Nadu. It is a splinter group of Periyar Dravidar Kazhagam. Its policy is to bring out social reform along the lines envisaged by Periyar E. V. Ramasamy.

It was founded on 12 August 2012. The party president is Kolathur Mani  and Viduthalai Rajendran is the general secretary.

References

External links
 http://www.dvkperiyar.com/
2012 establishments in Tamil Nadu

Dravidian movement
Politics of Tamil Nadu